Vimeiro is a freguesia (civil parish) in the municipality of Lourinhã in west-central Portugal. It is in the District of Lisboa. The population in 2011 was 1,470, in an area of 7.08 km².

Vimeiro was the site of the 1808 Battle of Vimeiro, where British forces under the Duke of Wellington defeated the French, ending the first French invasion of Portugal.  A monument was dedicated in Vimeiro on August 21, 1908, the 100th anniversary of the battle, by Manuel II of Portugal.

References

External links
 Columbia Encyclopedia entry

Freguesias of Lourinhã